Severn most commonly refers to the River Severn, the longest in the United Kingdom.

Severn may also refer to:

Rivers

Australia
 Severn River (New South Wales)
 Severn River (Queensland)

Canada
 Severn River (central Ontario)
 Severn River (northern Ontario)

New Zealand
 Severn River (New Zealand)

United Kingdom
 River Severn, the longest river in the United Kingdom
 Severn Estuary, the estuary of that river
 Bristol Channel, also known as the Severn Sea, the stretch of water to the west of the estuary
 River Seven, a river in North Yorkshire, England

United States
 Severn River (Maryland)
 Severn River (Virginia)

Places

Canada
 Severn, Ontario and Port Severn
 Fort Severn, a Hudson's Bay Company post at the mouth of the Severn River in northern Ontario
 Fort Severn Airport, Ontario, Canada
 Fort Severn First Nation, the northernmost community in Ontario
 Severn Bridge, Ontario, Canada

United Kingdom
 Severn Beach, South Gloucestershire, England
 Severn (Caldicot ward), an electoral ward in Monmouthshire, Wales
 Severn Stoke

United States
 Severn, Maryland, a census-designated place
 Severn, North Carolina, a town
 Fort Severn, one of the three original military bases that now make up the United States Naval Academy

People

People with the given name
 Severn Cullis-Suzuki (born 1979), environmental activist, speaker, television host and author
 Severn Darden (1929–1995), American comedian
 Severn Teackle Wallis (1816–1894), American lawyer

People with the surname
 Christopher Severn (born 1935), American former screen actor
 Claud Severn (1869–1933), British colonial governor of Hong Kong, son of Walter Severn
 Cliff Severn (1925-2014), American cricketer and child screen actor
 Dan Severn (born 1958), American martial artist and professional wrestler
 Edmund Severn (1862–1942), American violinist and composer
 Ernest Severn (1933-1987), American child screen actor
 James Severn (born 1991), English association footballer
 Joseph Severn (1793–1879), English portrait and subject painter
 Raymond Severn (1930-1994), American cricketer and child screen actor
 Walter Severn (1830–1904), English watercolour artist, son of Joseph Severn
 William Severn (1938-1983), American child screen actor
 Winston Severn (born 1942), American former cricketer and child screen actor
 Yvonne Severn (1927-2006), American child screen actress

People with the title
 Prince Edward, Duke of Edinburgh (born 1964) has the title Viscount Severn as one of his subsidiary titles.

Arts, entertainment, and media
 Severn Sound, a UK Independent Local Radio station that broadcasts throughout Gloucestershire
 Severn Valley (Cthulhu Mythos), a fictional setting in the writings of Ramsey Campbell
 The Severn (radio), a radio station serving Shrewsbury and Oswestry, England

Ships
 HMS Severn, the name of nine ships and one submarine of the Royal Navy
 Severn-class lifeboat, the largest class of lifeboat used by the RNLI
 SS Severn River
 USS Severn (1867), a ship from the American Civil War

Other uses
 Severn, a codename of an early beta version of the Fedora operating system, then known as Red Hat Linux 9.0.93
 Severn School, an independent preparatory school in Severna Park, Maryland

See also
 Seven (disambiguation)
 Severny (disambiguation)